D&B Together (originally titled Country Life) is the sixth album by Delaney & Bonnie and Friends and their first for Columbia Records. It was their last album of new material, as Delaney and Bonnie Bramlett would divorce soon after its release.

Background
Country Life, Delaney & Bonnie's sixth album, was anticipated by the artist's label Atco (Atlantic) Records following the success of their previous three albums and of "Never Ending Song of Love," a single from their last album Motel Shot; moreover, Atlantic executive Jerry Wexler had developed a personal friendship with the artists.  The album was delivered to Atlantic behind schedule, and was rushed into distribution upon delivery in early 1972 (Atco catalog no. SD 33-383).  However, Wexler found the album's quality unsatisfactory and quickly withdrew it from the market. Wexler discovered that Delaney and Bonnie's marriage was under strain, and responded by selling their contract and this album's master tapes to CBS.  CBS reordered the running sequence of the album as shown below, and re-released it in March 1972, using different cover art, as D&B Together (Columbia/CBS catalog no. KC 31377).

In 2003, Delaney Bramlett said, "I thought Country Life was a fine piece of work, so did Bonnie.  Unfortunately, Jerry Wexler didn't agree."

Guest musicians on the album include Eric Clapton, Leon Russell, Duane Allman, Dave Mason, John Hartford, Billy Preston, Tina Turner and Steve Cropper. The standout tracks (all issued prior to the album's release as singles on Atco/Atlantic) are "Move 'Em Out", "Only You Know and I Know", "Comin' Home" and "Groupie (Superstar)."  The last two tracks on this album date back to Delaney and Bonnie's sessions for Eric Clapton in November 1969.

Track listing 
 "Only You Know and I Know"  (Dave Mason) – 3:26
 "Wade in the River of Jordan"  (Traditional, arr. Delaney Bramlett) – 2:10
 "Sound of the City"  (Delaney Bramlett, Joe Hicks) – 2:39
 "Well, Well"  (Delaney Bramlett) – 3:03
 "I Know How It Feels to Be Lonely"  (Bonnie Bramlett, Leon Ware) – 3:47
 "Comin' Home"  (Bonnie Bramlett, Eric Clapton) – 3:13
 "Move 'Em Out"  (Steve Cropper, Bettye Crutcher) – 2:50
 "Big Change Comin'"  (Delaney Bramlett) – 3:22
 "A Good Thing (I'm on Fire)"  (Delaney Bramlett, Gordon DeWitty) – 2:13
 "Groupie (Superstar)"  (Delaney Bramlett, Leon Russell) – 2:49
 "I Know Something Good About You"  (Delaney Bramlett, Joe Hicks) – 4:11
 "Country Life"  (Delaney Bramlett, Bobby Whitlock) – 3:38
A remastered version of the album was released by Columbia/Legacy in 2003.  This version of the album, which was compiled with Delaney Bramlett's assistance, contains six additional tracks recorded by Delaney and Bonnie during 1972–73 as solo artists following their breakup.  The additional tracks are:
 Delaney Bramlett "Over and Over" (Delaney Bramlett) – 2:41
 Delaney Bramlett "I'm Not Your Lover, Just Your Lovee" (Delaney Bramlett, Doug Gilmore) – 4:28
 Bonnie Bramlett "Good Vibrations" (Gordon DeWitty) – 3:13
 Delaney Bramlett "Are You a Beatle or a Rolling Stone" (Delaney Bramlett, Doug Gilmore) – 3:22
 Bonnie Bramlett "(You Don't Know) How Glad I Am" (Jimmy Williams, Larry Harrison) – 3:58
 Delaney Bramlett "California Rain" (Delaney Bramlett, Doug Gilmore) – 3:52

Personnel 

 Delaney Bramlett – guitar, vocals
 Bonnie Bramlett – vocals
 Eric Clapton – guitar, vocals
 Leon Russell – piano, keyboards, vocals
 Duane Allman – guitar, vocals
 Dave Mason – guitar, vocals
 Carl Radle – bass, vocals
 John Hartford – banjo, vocals
 Steve Cropper – guitar, vocals
 Jim Gordon – drums, vocals
 Red Rhodes – steel guitar, vocals
 Jaimoe – drums, vocals
 Billy Preston – keyboards, piano, vocals
 Charlie Freeman – guitar, vocals
 Kenny Gradney – bass, vocals
 Bobby Whitlock – keyboards, vocals
 Bobby Keys – saxophone, vocals
 James Jamerson – bass, vocals
 Jerry Jumonville – saxophone, vocals
 King Curtis – saxophone, vocals
 Larry Knechtel – bass, vocals
 Darrell Leonard – trumpet, vocals
 Jim Price – horns, vocals
 Chuck Rainey – bass, vocals
 Larry Savoie – trombone, vocals
 Rita Coolidge – vocals
 Tina Turner – vocals
 Venetta Fields – vocals
 Merry Clayton – vocals
 Eddie Kendricks – vocals
 Sam Clayton – vocals
 Joe Hicks – vocals
 Patrice Holloway – vocals
 Tex Johnson – vocals
 Clydie King – vocals
 Sherlie Matthews – vocals
 Gordon De Witty – vocals
 Jay York – vocals

Production 
 Producer: David Anderle/Doug Gilmore/Delaney Bramlett
 Recording Engineer: Tom Dowd/James Greene
 Art Direction: Howard Fritzson
 Photography: David Gahr/Beverly Parker/Sandy Speiser
 Liner Notes (2003 remastered edition): Greg Martin

References 

Delaney & Bonnie albums
1972 albums
Albums produced by Delaney Bramlett
Albums produced by David Anderle
Columbia Records albums
Country rock albums by American artists